Baekhwasan is a mountain between the county of Goesan, Chungcheongbuk-do and the city of Mungyeong, Gyeongsangbuk-do in South Korea.

See also
List of mountains in Korea

Notes

References

Mountains of South Korea
Mountains of North Chungcheong Province
Mountains of North Gyeongsang Province
Goesan County
Mungyeong
One-thousanders of South Korea